Sergey Prokopyev (born 21 August 1986) is a Russian beach volleyball player. He competed for Russia at the 2012 Summer Olympics with Konstantin Semenov.

References

Russian beach volleyball players
Beach volleyball players at the 2012 Summer Olympics
Olympic beach volleyball players of Russia
1986 births
Living people
Sportspeople from Smolensk
Universiade medalists in beach volleyball
Universiade silver medalists for Russia
Medalists at the 2011 Summer Universiade
20th-century Russian people
21st-century Russian people